20-Hydroxyecdysone (ecdysterone or 20E) is a naturally occurring ecdysteroid hormone which controls the ecdysis (moulting) and metamorphosis of arthropods. It is therefore one of the most common moulting hormones in insects, crabs, etc. It is also a phytoecdysteroid produced by various plants, including Cyanotis vaga, Ajuga turkestanica and Rhaponticum carthamoides where its purpose is presumably to disrupt the development and reproduction of insect pests. In arthropods, 20-hydroxyecdysone acts through the ecdysone receptor. Although mammals lack this receptor, 20-hydroxyecdysone may affect mammalian (including human) biological systems in vitro, but there is uncertainty whether any in vivo or physiological effects occur. 20-Hydroxyecdysone is an ingredient of some supplements that aim to enhance physical performance. In humans, it is hypothesized to bind to the estrogen receptor beta (ERβ) protein-coding gene.

Sources in arthropods
The primary sources of 20-hydroxyecdysone in larvae are the prothoracic gland, ring gland, gut, and fat bodies. These tissues convert dietary cholesterol into the mature forms of the hormone 20-hydroxyecdysone. For the most part these glandular tissues are lost in the adult with exception of the fat body, which is retained as a sheath of lipid tissue surrounding the brain and organs of the abdomen.  In the adult female the ovary is a substantial source of 20-hydroxyecdysone production. Adult males are left with, so far as is currently known, one source of 20-hydroxyecdysone which is the fat body tissue. These hormone producing tissues express the ecdysone receptor throughout development, possibly indicating a functional feedback mechanism.

Ecdysteroid activity in arthropods
An ecdysteroid is a type of steroid hormones in insects that are derived from enzymatic modification of cholesterol by p450 enzymes.  This occurs by a mechanism similar to steroid synthesis in vertebrates.  Ecdysone and 20-hydroxyecdysone regulate larval molts, onset of puparium formation, and metamorphosis.  Being that these hormones are hydrophobic, they traverse lipid membranes and permeate the tissues of an organism.  Indeed, the main receptor of these hormone signals - the ecdysone receptor - is an intracellular protein.

In humans and other mammals

Use as supplement
20-Hydroxyecdysone and other ecdysteroids are marketed as ingredients in nutritional supplements for various sports, particularly bodybuilding. A comprehensive study, designed to find any strength or athletic improvement from 20-hydroxyecdysone, was published in 2006. The study looked for improvement in actual exercises performed and tested for improvements/increases in chemical indicators such as body composition and free/available testosterone. The results of the 2006 study concluded that using 30 mg per day of 20-hydroxyecdysone administered orally did not significantly affect anabolic or catabolic responses to resistance training, body composition, or training adaptations. However, a number of earlier studies supported the anabolic effects of 20-Hydroxyecdysone. A more recent study conducted in 2019 by a team that included the Department for Molecular and Cellular Sports Medicine at the German Sport University Cologne, found that significantly higher increases in muscle mass were observed in participants dosed with ecdysterone, with significantly more pronounced increases in one-repetition bench press performance. The study was funded by the World Anti-Doping Agency (WADA) and demonstrated a significant dose-responsive anabolic effect of 20-Hydroxyecdysone supplementation on athletes during resistance training. Furthermore, recent studies have elucidated that the mechanism of action of 20-Hydroxyecdysone on human muscle cells is relatively selective activation of the beta form of the estrogen receptor (ERβ), which is known to result in muscle hypertrophy.

Use as research tool
20-Hydroxyecdysone and other ecdysteroids are used in biochemistry research as inducers in transgenic animals, whereby a new gene is introduced into an animal so that its expression is under the control of an introduced ecdysone receptor.  Adding or removing ecdysteroids from the animal's diet then gives a convenient way to turn the inserted gene on or off (see ecdysone receptor). At usual doses, 20-hydroxyecdysone appears to have little or no effect on animals that do not have extra genes inserted; it also has high bioavailability when taken orally, so it is useful for determining whether the transgene has been taken up effectively. For uses in gene therapy, it may be necessary to investigate more thoroughly the natural sources of ecdysteroids in humans (which appear to include dietary phytoecdysteroids, gut flora, helminth infections, and other diseases).

External links
 Ecdybase, The Ecdysone Handbook - a free online ecdysteroids database

References 

Insect hormones
Primary alcohols
Sterols
Tertiary alcohols